New Taipei Municipal Zhuwei High School (ZWHS) is a combined junior and senior high school located in Tamsui District, New Taipei City, Taiwan. It was founded in 1996. As of 2014, the principal was Wu Zong-Min.

School and History 
The campus of Zhuwei High School leans towards the Datun Mountain Range and looks out on the Tamsui River and Guanyin Mountain. Beautiful views surround a campus of 4.6 hectares, and this ideal environment is serviced by a full-range of facilities. As a suburb of the Taipei metropolitan area, the convenient MRT system has brought a fast expansion in the population of Zhuwei. Originally, there was only one elementary school in the area and graduates had to travel into the more populated town center to attend secondary schools.

The community was in need of a secondary school, and petitions were launched to address this need. In order to answer the needs of the community and ensure balanced development of education, Taipei County Government approved a plan to build a fourth junior high school, named Taipei County Municipal Zhuwei High School, in the Tamsui area on October 26, 1989. On August 1, 2012, the School was reorganized into a high school and named the New Taipei City Zhuwei Senior High School. This upgrade established the school as the 15th complete secondary school in New Taipei City and the only public school in the Tamsui area. In the same year, the school enrolled its first batch of high school freshmen (10th graders), and Wu Chong Min was appointed as the first principal of this newly upgraded secondary school.

External links 
新北市立竹圍高級中學
New Taipei Municipal Zhuwei High School

1996 establishments in Taiwan
Schools in New Taipei
Educational institutions established in 1996